The 1990 Critérium du Dauphiné Libéré was the 42nd edition of the cycle race and was held from 28 May to 4 June 1990. The race started in Aix-les-Bains and finished in Annecy. The race was won by Robert Millar of the Z-Tomasso team.

Teams
Sixteen teams, containing a total of 128 riders, participated in the race:

 
 
 
 
 
 
 
 
 
 
 
 
 
 
 
 Colombia amateur team

Route

Stages

Stage 1
28 May 1990 – Aix-les-Bains to Aix-les-Bains,

Stage 2
29 May 1990 – Aix-les-Bains to L'Isle-d'Abeau,

Stage 3
30 May 1990 – Annonay to Aubenas,

Stage 4
31 May 1990 – Vals-les-Bains to Avignon,

Stage 5
1 June 1990 – Avignon to Gap,

Stage 6
2 June 1990 – Gap to Allevard-les-Bains,

Stage 7
3 June 1990 – Allevard-les-Bains to Annecy,

Stage 8
4 June 1990 – Annecy to Annecy,

General classification

References

Further reading

1990
1990 in French sport
May 1990 sports events in Europe
June 1990 sports events in Europe